Frederick "Fred" Stenson (born December 22, 1951) is a Canadian writer of historical fiction and nonfiction relating to the Canadian West.

In addition to his published work, Stenson has been a faculty member at The Banff Centre, where he has directed the Wired Writing Studio for eleven years. He is also a documentary film writer, with over 140 credits. He writes a regular wit column for Alberta Views Magazine. His 2000 novel The Trade was shortlisted for Canada's Giller Prize.  Both The Trade and his 2003 novel Lightning won the Grant MacEwan Author's Prize for best Alberta book of the year. His 2008 novel The Great Karoo was nominated for the 2008 Governor General's Literary Award in Fiction and was a nominee for the 2009 Commonwealth Writers Prize for Best Book (Canada/Caribbean).

Stenson was raised on a farm and cattle ranch in the Waterton region of southwest Alberta. He is married to the poet Pamela Banting and lives in Cochrane, Alberta. His son Ted is a film director, whose feature debut Events Transpiring Before, During and After a High School Basketball Game was released in 2020.

Bibliography
 Lonesome Hero - 1974
 Rocky Mountain House - 1985
 Waste to Wealth - 1985
 Last One Home - 1988
 Working Without a Laugh Track - 1990
 The Story of Calgary - 1994
 Teeth - 1994
 RCMP: The March West - 1999
 The Last Stack - 2000
 The Trade - 2000
 Lightning - 2003
 Thing Feigned or Imagined - 2003
 The Great Karoo - 2008
 Who by Fire – 2014

References 

Canadian male novelists
1951 births
Living people
Canadian people of Norwegian descent
Writers from Calgary
People from Cochrane, Alberta